The Pacific Division is one of the three divisions in the Western Conference of the National Basketball Association (NBA). The division consists of five teams, the Golden State Warriors, the Los Angeles Clippers, the Los Angeles Lakers, the Phoenix Suns and the Sacramento Kings. All teams, except the Suns, are based in California.

The division was created at the start of the 1970–71 season, when the league expanded from 14 to 17 teams with the addition of the Buffalo Braves, the Cleveland Cavaliers and the Portland Trail Blazers. The league realigned itself into two conferences, the Western Conference and the Eastern Conference, with two divisions each in each conference. The Pacific Division began with five inaugural members, the Lakers, the Blazers, the San Diego Rockets, the San Francisco Warriors and the Seattle SuperSonics. The Lakers, the Rockets, the Warriors and the SuperSonics all joined from the Western Division.

The Lakers have won the most Pacific Division titles with 24. The Phoenix Suns have the second most titles with eight. 19 NBA champions have come from the Pacific Division. The Lakers have won 12 championships, the Warriors won 5, and the Blazers and Sonics won one championship each. All of them, except the 1976–77 Blazers, the 2001–02 Lakers and the 2021–22 Warriors, were division champions. In the 1991–92 season, six teams from the division qualified for the playoffs. In the 1977–78 season, all teams in the division had winning percentages above 0.500 (50%). The most recent division champions are the Phoenix Suns.

Since the 2021–22 season, the Pacific Division champions has received the Chuck Cooper Trophy, named after Hall of Famer Chuck Cooper.

Current standings

Teams

Former teams

Notes
 denotes an expansion team.

Team timeline

Chuck Cooper Trophy
Beginning with the 2021–22 season, the Pacific Division champions has received the Chuck Cooper Trophy. As with the other division championship trophies, it is named after one of the African American pioneers from NBA history. Chuck Cooper became the first African-American to be drafted by an NBA team when the Boston Celtics selected him with the first pick in the second round of the 1950 draft. The Cooper Trophy consists of a  crystal ball.

Division champions

Titles by team

Season results

Rivalries

Los Angeles Lakers vs. Los Angeles Clippers

Notes
 Because of a lockout, the season did not start until February 5, 1999, and all 29 teams played a shortened 50-game regular season schedule.
 Because of a lockout, the season did not start until December 25, 2011, and all 30 teams played a shortened 66-game regular season schedule.

References
General

Specific

External links
NBA.com Team Index

Western Conference (NBA)
National Basketball Association divisions
Golden State Warriors
Houston Rockets
Los Angeles Clippers
Los Angeles Lakers
Phoenix Suns
Portland Trail Blazers
Sacramento Kings
San Diego Clippers
San Diego Rockets
San Francisco Warriors
Seattle SuperSonics
Sports in the Western United States
1970 establishments in the United States